Steven Joseph Engler (born 1962) is a Canadian scholar of religion, Professor at Mount Royal University, Professor Colaborador in the Graduate Program in Ciêncas da Religião at the Pontifical Catholic University of São Paulo (Brazil), and affiliate Professor in the Department of Religion at Concordia University.

Engler is the co-editor of leading journals and book series in the field of religious studies. In his work, he has analyzed major publications of the field and the academic landscape of religious studies in Latin America. His research focuses on Christianity in Latin America, especially Brazil, and on related religions such as Kardecism and Umbanda. His work on theories of religion engages semantic holism, a philosophical position in the area of semantics.

Biography
Engler was born and raised in the interior of British Columbia. He received a Bachelor of Arts degree in philosophy from the University of British Columbia in 1986; a Master of Arts degree in philosophy from the University of Toronto in 1989; and a Doctor of Philosophy degree in religion from Concordia University in 1999.

Professional activities 
 Co-editor (with Michael Stausberg) of the journal Religion.
 Co-editor (with Michael Stausberg) of the Oxford Handbook of the Study of Religion
 Co-editor (with Bettina E. Schmidt) of Handbook of Contemporary Religions in Brazil (Brill)
 Co-editor (with Michael Stausberg) of The Routledge Handbook of Research Methods in the Study of Religion
 Co-editor of the Numen book series, Studies in the History of Religions (Brill).
 Co-editor of the Religion in the Americas book series (Brill).
 Editor of the NAASR book series Key Thinkers in the Study of Religion (Routledge).
 Member of the editorial board of the Brazilian journal Horizonte

References

External links 
 
 Theoretical Issues in the Study of Religion - Special issue of the Brazilian on-line journal Revista de Estudos da Religião (Rever) on theory of religion, edited by Engler.

1962 births
Canadian religion academics
Concordia University alumni
Living people
Academic staff of Mount Royal University
People from British Columbia
Religious studies scholars
University of British Columbia alumni
University of Toronto alumni